Hutterer's brush-furred mouse or Hutterer's brush-furred rat (Lophuromys huttereri) is a species of rodent in the family Muridae. It is found only in Democratic Republic of the Congo, where its natural habitat is subtropical or tropical moist lowland forests.

References

Lophuromys
Mammals described in 1996
Taxonomy articles created by Polbot
Endemic fauna of the Democratic Republic of the Congo